Charul Malik  is a news anchor, journalist & now an actress.  Charul recently quit India Tv as a Senior Anchor & Executive Editor & has started her new stint as an actress with popular soaps like Bhabiji Ghar Par Hain! & Happu Ki Ultan Paltan on &TV where she plays a role of a beautiful girl Russa.

Prior to this she has worked as an Anchor & Executive Editor with India TV, her previous associations were with  Aaj Tak as an Associate Editor and anchor in Mumbai.

Early life
Born in Delhi  in 1985 to a Malik family from Faridabad (Haryana), her parents moved to Chandigarh just after her birth. Her father G.S. Malik is an eminent lawyer in Punjab and Haryana High Court and mother Asha Malik, a teacher in Chandigarh. She has a twin sister named Parul and a younger brother Gaurav Malik.
 
After Class X, she did Class XII in arts and then went on to complete her BA (HONS) with LL.B.  
 
Charul said she spent most of childhood days with her family watching television. During those days, Doordarshan was the only available TV channel, and Salma Sultan and Nalini Singh were her role models.

Career

Journalism
Charul Malik started her career with Jain TV News Channel through an open interview and has gone on to become one of the finest news readers in the vast expanding industry. Famous TV celebrities Prannoy Roy and Vinod Dua have even complimented her on her fine flow of speech on more than one occasion. "Their compliments have infused into me more confidence and inspiration," says Charul.

Charul has worked with Sahara Samay Channel before joining STAR News now ABP News where she had been one of the leading anchors, delivering news regularly since 2006.

Acting career
Charul has also acted in serials like Bhabiji Ghar Par Hain!.

Awards and recognition
Charul has been the only anchor in the world who has conducted a live interview on Skates and the same has been accredited by the LIMCA book of records.
 
Charul has been conferred with the News Television Award 2014 for "The Best News Anchor Entertainment".

Charul also won the MY CITY award for the Best Entertainment News Anchor for the year 2014/15.

Charul was also nominated for the Best Anchor with the award AVTA (Asian Viewers Television Awards), where she narrowly lost to Barkha Dutt of NDTV in the final round.

References

Living people
Hindi journalists
Indian broadcast news analysts
Indian women television journalists
Indian television journalists
Journalists from Delhi
Indian twins
Year of birth missing (living people)